The Manual for Courts-Martial (MCM) is the official guide to the conduct of courts-martial in the United States military.  An Executive Order of the President of the United States, the MCM details and expands on the military law established in the statute Uniform Code of Military Justice (UCMJ). It gathers both executive orders as well as opinions of said executive orders. The MCM contains five parts plus 22 appendices:
Part I is the Preamble, which gives background and jurisdictional information
Part II explains the Rules for Courts-martial (Rules 101 through 1307)
Part III lays out the Military Rules of Evidence (Rules 101 through 1103)
Part IV sets forth the elements and punishments of offenses (Punitive Articles, paragraphs 101 through 108)
Part V provides guidelines for the imposition of non-judicial punishment (NJP)
Appendices provide the Constitution of the United States, the UCMJ itself, analysis of the Parts, historical Executive Orders, forms, etc.

In June 2019, the Federal Register published the 2019 Manual for Courts-Martial with all recent changes.

See also
Air Force Court of Criminal Appeals
Army Court of Criminal Appeals
Coast Guard Court of Criminal Appeals
Navy-Marine Corps Court of Criminal Appeals
Uniform Code of Military Justice

References 

 2019 Amendments to the Manual for Courts-Martial
 Completely revised Manual for Courts-Martial

External links 
 Manual for Courts-Martial (MCM), United States (2019 Edition)
 Manual for Courts-Martial (MCM), United States (2016 Edition) Caution: 6.9 MB PDF document.
 Manual for Courts-Martial (MCM), United States (2012 Edition) Caution: 6.64 MB PDF document.
 Manual for Courts-Martial (MCM), United States (2008 Edition) Caution: 5.54 MB PDF document.
 Manual for Courts-Martial (MCM), United States (2005 Edition) Caution: 9.92 MB PDF document.
 Manual for Courts-Martial (MCM), United States (2000 Edition) Caution: 3.5 MB PDF document.
 2013 Amendments to the Manual for Courts-Martial, United States PDF document.

Courts-martial in the United States
United States military law
Publications of the United States government
Handbooks and manuals
Legal literature
United States executive orders